Myscelia orsis is a species of nymphalid butterflies native to Brazil. It was first described by Dru Drury in 1782.

Description
Upperside: Antennae, thorax, and abdomen brown, the latter having six spots on it. Wings very dark changeable blue; anterior having a pale streak crossing them a little way on each side the thorax, with several other small ones on other parts.

Underside: Palpi very small, hairy, and white. Thorax, legs and abdomen white. Wings pale red brown, having a shade of darker colour running along their external edges, and on the anterior ones are placed two faint-coloured streaks, running from the external edges towards the middle of the wings. Margins of the wings angulated and dentated. Wingspan .

References

Biblidinae
Nymphalidae of South America
Butterflies described in 1782
Descriptions from Illustrations of Exotic Entomology